Port Moresby General Hospital (PMGH) is the largest hospital in Papua New Guinea. It is located in Korobosea, a suburb of Port Moresby in the National Capital District. A major teaching hospital, it is adjacent to the University of Papua New Guinea's School of Medicine and Health Sciences.

References

Hospitals in Papua New Guinea
Buildings and structures in Port Moresby